A list of crime films released in the 1990s.

List of crime films of 1990
List of crime films of 1991
List of crime films of 1992
List of crime films of 1993
List of crime films of 1994
List of crime films of 1995
List of crime films of 1996
List of crime films of 1997
List of crime films of 1998
List of crime films of 1999

Lists of 1990s films by genre
1990s